Denis O'Sullivan (born 11 June 1989) is an Irish Gaelic footballer who plays as a left wing-back for the New York senior football team.

Born in Ballinascarty, County Cork, O'Sullivan first arrived on the inter-county scene at the age of seventeen, when he first linked up with the Cork minor teams as a dual player, before later joining the under-21 football side. He made his senior debut during the 2011 National Football League. Over the next few years, O'Sullivan became a regular member of the team and won one Munster medal and one National Football League medal. He currently plays with New York.

At club level, O'Sullivan began his career with Ballinascarthy before a controversial move to Clonakilty. He currently plays with Cork.

Honours

Team

Cork
Munster Senior Football Championship (1): 2012
National Football League (1): 2011

References

1989 births
Living people
Ballinascarthy Gaelic footballers
Ballinascarthy hurlers
Clonakilty Gaelic footballers
Clonakilty hurlers
Cork inter-county hurlers
Cork inter-county Gaelic footballers
New York Gaelic footballers
Dual players